India's nuclear test series consists of a pair of series: Pokhran I and Pokhran II. Pokhran I was a single nuclear test conducted in 1974.

Test Series

Pokhran I

The India test series summary table is below.

The detonations in the India's Pokhran I series are listed below:

Pokhran II

Pokhran II was a group of 2 nuclear tests conducted in 1998.

Summary

References

Sources

 
 

India science and technology-related lists